Sainte-Agnès is the name of several communes in France:

 Sainte-Agnès, in the Alpes-Maritimes department
 Sainte-Agnès, in the Isère department
 Sainte-Agnès, in the Jura department